Keith Johnson (born 10 August 1935) is a South African cricketer. He played in ten first-class matches for Border from 1955/56 to 1958/59.

See also
 List of Border representative cricketers

References

External links
 

1935 births
Living people
South African cricketers
Border cricketers
Cricketers from East London, Eastern Cape